José Figueroa (1792 – 29 September 1835), was a General and the Mexican Governor of Alta California from 1833 to 1835. He wrote the first book to be published in California.

Background and governorship

Figueroa was a Mestizo of Spanish and Aztec ancestry, and was proud of his Indian background. He had served as a military officer on the Sonoran frontier. He achieved the rank of brevet brigadier general.

Figueroa was appointed governor of Alta California in 1832, and arrived for duty in January 1833. Due to political turbulence, Alta California had two rival acting governors at that time. Agustín V. Zamorano held office in Monterey in the north, while José María de Echeandía ruled Southern California from Los Angeles and San Diego. Both men deferred to Figueroa, and the government of Alta California was united.

Figueroa oversaw the initial secularization of the missions of Alta (upper) California, which included the expulsion of the Spanish Franciscan mission officials. His government issued many Mexican land grants for former mission lands, although these had originally been intended to be held in trust for Mission Indians. He also had to deal with the Híjar-Padrés Colony in Los Angeles, which briefly rebelled against his rule.

Many of the communities that had developed around the twenty-one missions became secular pueblos (towns). Most of the towns kept their previous mission names. In the case of Mission Santa Cruz, Figueroa considered changing the town name to Villa Figueroa, but the change was never put into effect.

Híjar-Padrés colony

In 1833, the Mexican Congress passed legislation to secularize the California missions. Acting Mexican president Valentín Gómez Farías, a liberal reformer, appointed José María de Híjar and D. José María Padrés to lead a group of 239 colonists to establish secular control of Alta California. Híjar, a wealthy landowner, was appointed governor to replace Figueroa, and Padrés, an army officer, was appointed military commander. The colonists were farmers and artisans, and were volunteers carefully selected by Farías. His objective was to modernize and strengthen Mexican rule over California, as a bulwark against the growing influence of Russia and the United States.

While the colonists were traveling north to Alta California on two ships, president Antonio López de Santa Anna took full power, and revoked Híjar's appointment as governor, thereby allowing Figueroa to continue in that post. A horseman traveled for 40 days from Mexico City to Monterey to bring the news to Figueroa. The Morelos arrived in San Diego on 1 September 1833, and La Natalie in Monterey on 25 September. As the horseback courier had preceded them, Híjar learned to his consternation that he had no official powers.

Figueroa objected to the colonization plan since he believed that at least half of the mission lands should be turned over to California natives, as had been the Crown's stated intention. The Franciscan missionaries had been charged with administering the missions in trust for the original inhabitants of the region. On 4 August 1834, Figueroa issued a 180-page proclamation setting out a plan for secularization of the missions, which was far more favorable to the native peoples than was the Híjar-Padrés plan.

On 7 March 1835, a small group of the Híjar-Padrés colonists launched a brief rebellion against Figueroa in Los Angeles. Although the rebels took control of the town hall, the revolt promptly collapsed. Its leaders were arrested.

When word of the failed coup reached Figueroa, he had Híjar and Padrés arrested. Híjar and his closest associates were ousted from California, although many of the colonists stayed and became productive citizens there.

Figueroa's manifesto

In 1835, Figueroa published in Monterey, California his manifesto defending his administration and explaining his opposition to the Híjar-Padrés colonization plan. This was the first book published in California.

Illness, death and burial

Francisco García Diego y Moreno, who later became California's first bishop, reported that Figueroa was "greatly agitated on account of the disturbances that the colonists caused", and set out on a strenuous voyage in 1835 to calm the political turmoil. He sailed from Monterey to San Francisco, and with very little rest, on to San Diego and then he returned to Monterey in June, 1835, and was "already ailing". Although he was initially able to continue his work, he felt weak and did not recover. He participated in the session of the territorial assembly that convened on 25 August, but informed that body on 27 August that he needed to take a leave of absence for health reasons, appointing José Castro as interim governor.

Beginning 6 September, he was confined to his bed and on 22 September, he resigned, appointing José Castro as his successor. On 27 September, he wrote his last will, asking that his body be preserved and buried at Mission Santa Barbara.

Figueroa died in Monterey on the afternoon of 29 September 1835. As he had requested, his body was preserved, and sent to Santa Barbara by ship where it arrived on 27 October. He was buried in a crypt beneath Mission Santa Barbara.

Rumors circulated after his death that he had been poisoned. The following year, Diego reported to the Mexican government that Figueroa had shown symptoms of apoplexy in his final months, and that blood clots had been discovered in his brain when his body was preserved after his death.

There were also persistent rumors that his body was not buried in Santa Barbara. In 1912, his casket was opened, and the body was consistent in that it was in a Mexican military uniform. The size of the skeleton matched Figueroa's small stature, no more than five feet, two inches tall.

Legacy
Early 20th-century historian J. M. Guinn wrote that "He [Figueroa] is generally regarded as the best of the Mexican governors sent to California". Historian Kevin Starr wrote that Figueroa was "the most competent governor of California during the Mexican era".

Landmarks named after General José Figueroa include:
Figueroa Mountain, in the San Rafael Mountains, Los Padres National Forest, Santa Barbara County, California
Figueroa Street and Figueroa Avenue, in Los Angeles, California
Figueroa Street Tunnels
Figueroa at Wilshire

Figueroa rancho land grants
Mexican land grants in Alta California issued by Governor José Figueroa:

Rancho Acalanes
Rancho Aguajito
Rancho Aptos
Rancho Arroyo de Las Nueces y Bolbones
Rancho Arroyo del Rodeo
Rancho Ausaymas y San Felipe
Rancho Bolsa de San Cayetano
Rancho Cañada del Corte de Madera
Rancho Cañón de Santa Ana
Rancho Corte Madera del Presidio
Rancho El Alisal
Rancho El Molino
Rancho El Rincon (Arellanes)
Rancho El Sur
Rancho Encinal y Buena Esperanza
Rancho Guadalupe y Llanitos de los Correos
Rancho Laguna Seca
Rancho Laguna Seca (Alvires)
Rancho Las Animas
Rancho Las Posas
Rancho Los Alamitos
Rancho Los Carneros (Littlejohn)
Rancho Monte del Diablo
Rancho Nuestra Señora del Refugio

Rancho Ojo del Agua de la Coche
Rancho Paso de Bartolo
Rancho Pescadero (Gonzalez)
Rancho Petaluma
Rancho Punta de Pinos
Rancho Salsipuedes
Rancho San Andrés
Rancho San Agustin
Rancho San Francisco de las Llagas
Rancho San Pascual
Rancho San Ramon (Amador)
Rancho San Ramon (Pacheco-Castro)
Rancho San Ysidro
Rancho Santa Teresa
Rancho Saucito
Rancho Sausal
Rancho Sespe
Rancho Solis
Rancho Soquel
Rancho Tecate
Rancho Tularcitos (Gomez)
Rancho Yerba Buena
Rancho Zayante

References

Californios
1792 births
1835 deaths
Governors of Mexican California
19th-century American politicians